The anterior chamber angle is a part of the eye located between the cornea and iris which contains the trabecular meshwork. The size of this angle is an important determinant of the rate aqueous humour flows out of the eye, and thus, the intraocular pressure. The anterior chamber angle is the structure which determines the anterior chamber depth. An extremely narrow anterior chamber angle is a feature of angle closure glaucoma.

Additional images

References

Human eye anatomy